For the 2004 ISSF World Cup Final in the seventeen Olympic shooting events, the World Cup Final was held in September 2004 in Maribor, Slovenia for the shotgun events, and in October 2004 in Bangkok, Thailand for the rifle, pistol and running target events. It was the last World Cup Final for the women's Double Trap event and the men's 10 m Running Target event, as they were taken off the Olympic program after 2004.

Shotgun
The winners in Maribor were:
  Adam Vella, Australia, in men's Trap
  Marco Innocenti, Italy, in men's Double Trap
  Tore Brovold, Norway, in men's Skeet
  Zuzana Štefečeková, Slovakia, in women's Trap
  Li Qingnian, China, in women's Double Trap
  Wei Ning, China, in women's Skeet

Rifle, pistol and running target
Munich, Germany is traditionally the steady home of this competition, but 2004 was the second year in a row that it was held at another venue. The winners in Bangkok were:
  Matthew Emmons, United States, in men's 50 m Rifle Three Positions
  Christian Lusch, Germany, in men's 50 m Rifle Prone
  Zhu Qinan, China, in men's 10 m Air Rifle
  Martin Tenk, Czech Republic, in men's 50 m Pistol
  Ralf Schumann, Germany, in men's 25 m Rapid Fire Pistol
  Mikhail Nestruev, Russia, in men's 10 m Air Pistol
  Aleksandr Blinov, Russia, in men's 10 m Running Target
  Lioubov Galkina, Russia, in women's 50 m Rifle Three Positions
  Du Li, China, in women's 10 m Air Rifle
  Mariya Grozdeva, Bulgaria, in women's 25 m Pistol
  Nino Salukvadze, Georgia, in women's 10 m Air Pistol

ISSF World Cup
World Cup
2004 in Thai sport
2004 in Slovenian sport
Sport in Maribor
Sport in Bangkok
2004 in Bangkok
Shooting competitions in Slovenia
Shooting competitions in Thailand